The Point of Rocks tryonia, scientific name Tryonia elata, is a species of freshwater snail, an aquatic gastropod mollusk in the family Hydrobiidae.

This species is endemic to the United States. The common name of the species refers to the area known as Point of Rocks, Maryland, in the USA.

References

Endemic fauna of the United States
Tryonia
Gastropods described in 1987
Taxonomy articles created by Polbot